The Orarion (Slavonic: орарь, orar) is the distinguishing vestment of the deacon and subdeacon in the Eastern Orthodox Church, Oriental Orthodox Churches and Eastern Catholic Churches.  It is a narrow stole, usually four to five inches (127 mm) wide and of various lengths, made of brocade, often decorated with crosses (three, five or seven) embroidered or appliquéd along its length. It is usually trimmed with decorative banding around the edges and fringe at the two ends.

Deacon
The deacon wears the orarion over his left shoulder with the front portion draped over his left forearm.  He will take this portion in his right hand when leading litanies or drawing attention to a particular liturgical action. This single orarion is the oldest form, as illustrated in traditional and older iconography.

Archdeacons and protodeacons are awarded the much longer double orarion, which is worn over the left shoulder, wrapped around the chest and back, and brought back over the left shoulder to the front. The Archdeacon's orarion may also have the word "Holy" embroidered three times on it in large letters, using nomina sacra where customary, in reference to the Trisagion. In modern Greek Orthodox practice, all deacons usually wear the double orarion.
 
When preparing for Communion, the deacon will wrap the orarion around his waist, bringing the ends up over his shoulders (forming a cross in back) and then straight down in front, tucking them under the section around the waist.

Armenian usage is identical to the Byzantine Rite, except that their deacons wear the single orarion, which they call urar.

Eastern Catholics follow the same tradition as do their Orthodox counterparts. Sometimes in Greek Catholic practice, the double orarion is worn only over the left shoulder (folded to make up for length) over a cassock if the deacon in question is preaching, but not participating otherwise. This use of the orarion on top of a cassock is most often seen among Greek-Catholics of the Ukrainian and Ruthenian tradition; this is a marked departure from general Byzantine practice, in which there is no tradition of wearing the orarion without sticharion.

Subdeacon
The subdeacon also wears the orarion, but always wrapped around his body in the manner described above.  In the Greek tradition, tonsured taper-bearers wear the orarion similarly crossed in back, but with the ends hanging parallel in front. In the same Greek tradition, altar-servers will sometimes be given a blessing to wear the orarion with the ends hanging parallel in front.

In Slavic Orthodox use, no one below the rank of subdeacon is usually permitted to wear the orarion.  However, readers and altar servers are sometimes given a blessing by the bishop to vest in the orarion and perform some limited functions of a subdeacon.  This is usually in cases where a man has been discerned to have a vocation to the subdiaconate and plans to marry but has not yet done so.  The canons require that if a man is to marry, he must do so before ordination to the subdiaconate, and that anybody who marries after subdiaconal ordination is to be deposed.

References

Eastern Orthodox liturgy
Oriental Orthodoxy
Eastern Christian vestments
History of clothing
History of clothing (Western fashion)
History of fashion
Byzantine clothing